Battle of Sasowy Róg may refer to:

 Battle of Sasowy Róg (1612), in which Stefan Potocki was defeated by Ottomans and Moldavians
 Battle of Sasowy Róg (1616), in which Samuel Korecki was defeated by the Ottomans
 Battle of Sasowy Róg (1633), part of the Polish–Ottoman War of 1633–1634 in which the Polish-Lithuanian Commonwealth defeated Ottoman troops